On the Loose is a 1984 Australian film consisting of three stories about teenagers in modern society. The film screened at the 1985 Sydney Film Festival and the 1986 Sundance Film Festival.

References

External links

Australian drama films
1984 films
1980s English-language films
1980s Australian films